Super Commando Dhruva titles have featured a long list of secondary supporting characters over the years that includes friends, foes, family, love interests and at times other Raj comics superheroes in crossovers. The first major recurring supporting character to be introduced in Dhruva series was his foster father I. G. Rajan Mehra in Dhruva's debut title itself. A couple of issues later Chandika, arguably the most important and most popular side character not only in Dhruva series but in entire Raj comics universe, was introduced. At times, Dhruva has appeared alongside other superheroes of Raj comics universe in multi-hero crossovers. Dhruva also has a well known rogues gallery full of an assortment of supervillains including Grand Master Robo, Chandakaal and Mahamanav.

Family
This section enlists characters who are either related to Dhruva (blood relatives/foster relatives) or are very close to him.

Immediate family
Following is the list of Dhruva's blood relatives.
 Shyam: Shyama was Dhruva's father. He worked as a trapeze artist in Jupiter circus. He was killed in front of Dhruva's eyes at the hands of rival Globe circus's strongman Jubisko. First appearance - GENL #74 'Pratishodh Ki Jwala' (1988)
 Radha: Radha was Shyam's wife and Dhruva's mother. She too worked as a trapeze artist in the Jupiter circus where she met Shyam for the first time. She was killed on the same fateful day of her husband's death in the Jupiter circus carnage. First appearance - GENL #74 'Pratishodh Ki Jwala' (1988)

Foster family
After the Jupiter circus carnage, when a 14yrs old Dhruva had nowhere to go, Rajangar's SP Rajan Mehra adopted him as his son. Dhruva grew really fond and protective of his foster family to the extent that when he found out that he had an extended family living in France and his grand father requested him to stay back in France and take care of the family's vast estate business, he rejected the idea citing that he can't leave his family in Rajnagar alone. His foster family consists of-
 IG Rajan Mehra: SP Rajan Mehra is a top ranked police office in Rajnagar police department. Initially an SP at the time of adopting Dhruva, he was later promoted to the post of IG. IG Rajan has been a constant ray of inspiration in Dhruva's vigil against criminals. First appearance - GENL #74 'Pratishodh Ki Jwala' (1988)
 Mrs. Rajni Mehra: She is IG Rajan's wife and a simple housewife. First appearance - GENL #74 'Pratishodh Ki Jwala' (1988)
 Shweta Mehra: Shweta is Dhruva's little foster sister, the only biological child of the Mehra's. She is a budding scientist and also functions as a masked heroine, Chandika, a secret even Dhruva doesn't know. First appearance - GENL #74 'Pratishodh Ki Jwala' (1988)

Love interests
Natasha: Natasha is Dhruva's primary love interest and the daughter of his enemy Grand Master Robo. Always torn up between her love for her superhero boyfriend and her criminal father, she keeps oscillating between the two worlds, the crime world of Robo and Dhruva's lawful world. In Nagayana, a futuristic parallel series set in alternate universe, Natasha has been shown to be Dhruva's lawfully wedded wife. First appearance - SPCL #2 'Grand Master Robo' (1991)
Richa: Known as Black cat. She has a team of trained cats.

Dhruva's lineage
Jalaj Son of Natasha
Rishi Son of Richa
Dhruvishya
Vitler: Vitler is Dhruva's descendant from a very distant future. Dhruva met Vitler when he time travelled to 25,496 AD. Unlike Dhruva and his other descendants, who were the protectors of humanity, Vitler was a tyrant dictator of his times who ruled half the world. After Dhruva's visit, Vitler has a change of heart resulting in bringing peace and harmony to the world. First appearance - GENL #230 'Udantashtari Ke Bandhak' (1991)

Friends and allies
Dhruva has a huge assortment of allies ranging from normal humans and masked vigilantes to ferals and superpowered beings. Apart from his own range of supporting characters, Dhruva has also interacted with other superheroes of Raj comics universe and often fought as a team with them against bigger threats. Following is the list of various allies of Dhruva:

Major allies
Chandika: Alter-Ego of Shweta. Chandika is the most important ally and most recurring character of Dhruva series. Chandika, a blonde superheroine who wears purple colored tights, blue boots and a blue domino mask, is the alter ego of Shweta, Dhruva's little sister. The only person who knows this secret is Natasha. Natasha herself has donned the identity of Chandika a couple of times to rescue Shweta from being identified. Chandika, like her brother, depends more on brains than brawns and to a large extent on her self-invented gadgets. In Nagayana, when Shweta was presumably dead, although later revived, Natasha kept Chandika alive by donning her costume. First appearance - GENL #96 'Swarg Ki Tabahi' (1989)
Dhananjay: Dhananjay is a warrior of Swarna-Nagri, a golden city hidden beneath the ocean, located at the ocean bed near Indian coast. It is the home to Swarna-Manavas, descendants of Gods. He carries a golden lasso and has the ability to make interdimensional transit window. He also provided Dhruva with the ability to breathe in water. First appearance - SPCL #2 'Grand Master Robo' (1991)
Jingaloo: Jingaloo is the prince of yetis residing in the Himalayas, and a very close friend of Dhruva. First appearance - GENL #140 'Barf Ki Chita' (1990)
Vanputra: Vanputra is a forest dweller, a tribal who lives in National Forest, a forest on the outskirts of Rajnagar. He is a plant manipulator. He has the ability to communicate with plants. On his command, plants can grow in a matter of seconds, can move and can even kill someone. First appearance - GENL #255 'Vinash Ke Vriksha' (1991)

Team associations

Jupiter Circus

Jupiter circus was where Dhruva was born and brought up in his childhood. Apart from Dhruva himself and his parents Shyam and Radha, following were the significant members of Jupiter circus:
Jacob: Jacob was the owner of Jupiter circus and loved Dhruva very much. He declared Dhruva a beneficiary in Jupiter circus insurance. The money he inherited from the insurance helped Dhruva to set up his own Commando Force after the Jupiter Circus carnage.
Pawan: A motorcycle stunt expert.
Hercules: Strongman of Jupiter circus.
Sulaiman: A sharp shooter.
Ranjan: Knife throwing expert.
Sherkhan: Ring-Master of Jupiter circus.
Anna: Used to run dolphin shows in Jupiter circus.

All the Jupiter Circus members made their first appearance in Dhruva's debut title GENL #74 'Pratishodh Ki Jwala' (1988) with the exception of Anna who made his first appearance in SPCL #2 'Grand Master Robo' (1991) in a flashback sequence. All the characters of Jupiter circus are believed to have died in the Jupiter circus carnage though, much later, Jacob was revealed to be the sole survivor when the character returned in SPCL #100 'Khooni Khandan' (1997) to help Dhruva find out the truth about his father's past.

Commando Force
Commando Force is a specially trained unit formed by Dhruva to aid him in his crime fighting sojourn. He used 50 lakh rupees that he received from Jupiter Circus insurance claim to establish it, while his foster father IG Rajan Mehra ensured he got all the necessary government approvals to establish the same. Initially, just 3 cadets strong with Rajnagar being their operative ground, commando force has expanded its presence throughout the country. Dhruva himself is the captain of the Commando Force. Apart from Dhruva, there are 3 prominent and named members in this team:
Peter Macey
Renu
Karim Shah
All three of them made their first appearance in GENL #79 'Roman Hatyara' (1988). While Peter and Renu do most of the field work, Karim is primarily a communications expert. Apart from these 3 named cadets, commando force has added many unnamed cadets to its ranks since its inception.

Villains

Dhruva's rogues gallery is one of the most identifiable one in Indian comics genre. Grand Master Robo, Chandakaal and Mahamanav are some of the most well known and recognisable villains in Indian comics. Dhruva's enemies include normal criminals like Jubisko, Champion Killer; tricksters like Bauna Waman, Vidooshak; mad scientists like Dhwaniraj, Dr. Virus; demons like Chandakaal and even aliens, but Dhruva's most implacable foe is Grand Master Robo. Some of Dhruva's enemies possess a bit more ambiguous personalities and are known to sometimes fight against him while supporting him on other occasions. Classic examples include Nostredamas, Commander Natasha, Black Cat and Nakshatra.

External links

Dhruva